Chanidae is a family of fishes which has a number of fossil genera and one monotypic extant genus which contains the milkfish (Chanos chanos).

Taxonomy
The family Chanidae is subdivided into two subfamilies, the Rubiesichthyinae, which comprises the extinct genera †Gordichthys, †Nanaichthys and †Rubiesichthys from the early Cretaceous, and the Chaninae which comprises the sole extant genus Chanos and the extinct genera †Dastilbe,  †Parachanos and  †Tharrhias, also from the early Cretacaeous.

References

 
Marine fish families
Taxa named by Albert Günther
Ray-finned fish families